Avksentyev/Avksentiev (male) or Avksentyeva/Avksentieva (feminine) an Old Slavic surname of ancient Greek origin from the male personal name Auxentius (Greek Αὐξέντιος). The following people share this last name:
Dmytro Avksentiev is a Ukrainian producer and musical artist  aka (Koloah)
Valery Avksentiev is a Ukrainian deputy of the regional council
Anton Avksentiev is Ukrainian candidate of political sciences

Alexandra Avksentiev (Alexandra Avksentyeva), birth name of Alexandra Pregel (1907–1984) artist
Eugen Avksentiev (Yevgeny Avksentiev), Ukrainian participant in the 2004 Star World Championships
Nikolai Avksentiev (Nikolay Avksentyev) (1878–1943), leading member of the  Socialist Revolutionary Party
Gabriela Avksentieva is Bulgarian Project Unit Manager @ Metlife

References

Notes

Sources



Russian-language surnames